Truncatus may refer to:
 The common bottlenose dolphin, Tursiops truncatus
 Bulinus truncatus, a freshwater snail species found in Senegal
 Boreotrophon truncatus, the bobtail trophon, a sea snail species
 Neuroxena truncatus, a moth species found in Ghana
 Notonomus truncatus, a ground beetle species

See also 
 C. truncata (disambiguation)